Castlemaine Boroughs was an electoral district of the Legislative Assembly in the Australian state of Victoria from 1856 to 1859. It included the towns Castlemaine, Muckleford, Harcourt and Elphinstone,
  
all roughly 110 to 130 km north-west of Melbourne. The boundaries included non-continuous urban areas.

The district of Castlemaine Boroughs was one of the initial districts of the first Victorian Legislative Assembly, 1856. Castlemaine Boroughs was abolished in 1859, the new district of Castlemaine was created that year when the Victorian Electoral Act of 1858 was implemented.

Members for Castlemaine Boroughs

Vincent Pyke became one of the three members of the new district of Castlemaine in 1859.

References

Former electoral districts of Victoria (Australia)
1856 establishments in Australia
1859 disestablishments in Australia